Conus rolani, common name Rolan's cone, is a species of sea snail, a marine gastropod mollusk in the family Conidae, the cone snails and their allies.

Like all species within the genus Conus, these snails are predatory and venomous. They are capable of "stinging" humans, therefore live ones should be handled carefully or not at all.

Description
The size of the shell varies between 37 mm and 70 mm.

Conantokin-R1-A is a toxin derived from the venom of Conus rolani.

This sea snail has recently been studied regarding its venom's toxic compounds that can replace the pain-killing effect of morphine.

Distribution
This marine species occurs off Taiwan and Papua New Guinea.

References

 Tucker J.K. & Tenorio M.J. (2009) Systematic classification of Recent and fossil conoidean gastropods. Hackenheim: Conchbooks. 296 pp.
 Puillandre N., Duda T.F., Meyer C., Olivera B.M. & Bouchet P. (2015). One, four or 100 genera? A new classification of the cone snails. Journal of Molluscan Studies. 81: 1–23

External links
 The Conus Biodiversity website
 Cone Shells - Knights of the Sea
 

rolani
Gastropods described in 1986